James Coburn (31 August 1882 – 5 December 1953) was an Irish politician.

Early and personal life
He was born 31 August 1882, one of seven children of George Coburn, a stonemason, and Bridget Coburn (née Flynn) of Camp St. (now Wolfe Tone St.), in Dundalk, County Louth. He was educated at Dundalk CBS, he became a bricklayer and after a time was promoted to foreman.

He was known as "The Juker Coburn" or "The Duker Coburn", possibly an allusion to his namesake the prizefighter Joseph Coburn, or to his shifting political allegiances. He married Elizabeth Grant, a teacher, on 26 August 1914. They had five sons and two daughters, and resided at 16 St Mary's Road, Dundalk. One of his sons was George Coburn, Fine Gael TD for Louth 1954 to 1961.

Politics
He entered local politics in 1920 when he was elected to Dundalk urban district council (1920–1953) and Louth County Council (1920–1953) as a nominee of both the trade and labour council and the Irish Parliamentary Party. He first stood for election as an independent Labour candidate for the Monaghan constituency at the 1923 general election but was unsuccessful. He was first elected to Dáil Éireann as a National League Party Teachta Dála (TD) for the Louth constituency at the June 1927 general election. Following Fianna Fáil's entry into the Dáil in August 1927, Coburn proposed that the National League support the Labour Party motion of no confidence in the government. The motion failed and in the subsequent election in September 1927 the National League was reduced to only two TDs, Coburn being one of them. He became an Independent TD in July 1931 following the disbandment of the National League. 

He was re-elected as an independent TD at the 1932 and 1933 general elections. He joined Fine Gael in 1933 shortly after its foundation. He was re-elected at each general election until the 1951 general election.

Coburn had sympathetic attitudes to Mussolini stating in the Dail in 1937 that "If I had a choice between Mussolini as leader, as President of the Irish Free State——if I had to make my choice as between him and the man representing Labour, that representative of sloppy sentimentalism in the form of cheap sloppy democracy, I would vote a thousand times for Mussolini. I am a trade unionist and a working man, and I know that under a man like Mussolini you will have protection and law and order and nothing will be taken by the waster from the thrifty section of the community."

He died during the 14th Dáil and the subsequent by-election on 3 March 1954 was won by his son George Coburn.

See also
Families in the Oireachtas

References

1882 births
1953 deaths
National League Party TDs
Independent TDs
Fine Gael TDs
Members of the 5th Dáil
Members of the 6th Dáil
Members of the 7th Dáil
Members of the 8th Dáil
Members of the 9th Dáil
Members of the 10th Dáil
Members of the 11th Dáil
Members of the 12th Dáil
Members of the 13th Dáil
Members of the 14th Dáil
Politicians from County Louth